The 2019–20 figure skating season began on July 1, 2019, and ended on June 30, 2020. During this season, elite skaters competed on the ISU Championship level at the 2020 European, Four Continents, and World Junior Championships; the World Championships were cancelled due to the COVID-19 pandemic. They also competed in elite events such as the Grand Prix series and Junior Grand Prix series, culminating in the Grand Prix Final, and the ISU Challenger Series.

Season notes

Age eligibility 
Skaters were eligible to compete in ISU events on the junior or senior levels according to their age:

Changes 

If skaters of different nationalities team up, the ISU requires that they choose one country to represent.Date refers to date when the change occurred or, if not available, the date when the change was announced.

Partnership changes

Retirements

Coaching changes

Nationality changes

Competitions 

Scheduled competitions:

Key

Cancelled 
All competitions following the 2020 World Junior Championships, including the 2020 World Championships in Montreal, were cancelled by either the ISU, the host federation, or the local government due to the COVID-19 pandemic. The affected events, in addition to the senior World Championships, include:
 March 13–15: Coupe du Printemps, Kockelscheuer, Luxembourg
 March 26–29: Egna Spring Trophy, Egna, Italy
 April 3–5: DVTK-AVAS Cup, Miskolc, Hungary
 April 6–12: Triglav Trophy & Narcisa Cup, Jesenice, Slovenia
 April 15–18: Golden Lynx, Gomel, Belarus

International medalists

Men

Ladies

Pairs

Ice dance

Season's best scores

Men

Best total score

Best short program score

Best free skating score

Ladies

Best total score

Best short program score

Best free skating score

Pairs

Best total score

Best short program score

Best free skating score

Ice dance

Best total score

Best rhythm dance score

Best free dance score

Standings and ranking

Current standings (top 30)

Men 
.

Ladies 
.

Pairs 
.

Ice dance 
.

Notes

References 

Seasons in figure skating

Figure skating